Sandway is a hamlet about one mile (1.6 km) to the SW of Lenham in the Maidstone district of Kent, England. The population is included in the civil parish of Boughton Malherbe.

External links

Villages in Kent